The 2019 World Archery Championships were held in 's-Hertogenbosch, Netherlands from 10 to 16 June 2019.

The event served as a qualifier for the 2020 Summer Olympics, with each men's and women's team that made the quarter-finals earning three quota places for the respective team. There were also quota places for the top four individuals in the singles competition, for those who failed to get quotas in the team events.

Medals table

Medals summary

Recurve

Compound

References

External links
 Official website
 Results book (Archived version)

 
World Archery Championships
World Championships
World Archery Championships
Archery Championships
Archery in the Netherlands
World Archery Championships
Sports competitions in 's-Hertogenbosch